Buneh (variously Jazīreh-ye Būneh) is a low-lying island in Khuzestan, Iran.

Location and geography 

Buneh Island is located in the far north of the Persian Gulf, at the mouth of Musa Bay, and is one of the four major islands in the estuary Hvor e-Musi. Nearby islands include Dara Island and Qabre Nakhoda Island.

References 

Populated places in Qazvin County
Islands of Iran
Islands of the Persian Gulf